Cry for Help is an EP by German hard rock band Bonfire. It was released in 2012 as a charity to prevent animal abuse. It was supported by PETA and specifically combated the Ukrainian government's policy to reward people for killing stray street dogs. The track "Cry for Help" was originally part of the album Double X, but has been re-recorded for this release. The band donated €1 to PETA for each sale made of the EP.  Although Dominik Huelshorst was the one whom performed on this release, the band's new drummer, Harry Reischmann, is shown in the music video to the song.

Track listing

Band members
Claus Lessmann – lead vocals and rhythm guitar
Hans Ziller – guitar
Chris Limburg – guitar
Uwe Köhler – bass
Dominik Huelshorst – drums and percussion

References

2012 EPs
Bonfire (band) albums